Dewitt Stetten Jr. (May 31, 1909 – August 28, 1990) was an American biochemist. Stetten was dean of the medical school of Rutgers University, president of the Foundation for Advanced Education in the Sciences, and a member of the National Academy of Sciences.
A collection of his papers is held at the National Library of Medicine in Bethesda, Maryland. He was married to fellow biochemist Marjorie Roloff Stetten.

Chronology 
 May 31, 1909 was born in New York City
 1930    A.B., Harvard College
 1934    M.D., Columbia University
 1940    Ph.D. in Biochemistry, Columbia University
 1962    appointed Dean of Medical School, Rutgers University
 1974    elected to the National Academy of Sciences

References

External links 

 J. Edwin Seegmiller, "Dewitt Stetten, Jr.", Biographical Memoirs of the National Academy of Sciences (1997)

1909 births
1990 deaths
American biochemists
Rutgers University faculty
Harvard College alumni
Columbia University Vagelos College of Physicians and Surgeons alumni
Members of the United States National Academy of Sciences